Hrvoje Smolčić (born 17 August 2000) is a Croatian professional footballer who plays as a centre back for Eintracht Frankfurt.

Club career
After playing for the youth teams of Croatian club Rijeka, Smolčić made his professional debut for the club's first team on 17 March 2019, when he appeared as a starter in a 3–1 victory against Osijek. In the 2019–20 season, he played 24 league matches and won the Croatian Cup with his team, appearing in three cup matches, but missing the final against Lokomotiva Zagreb due to being suspended after receiving two yellow cards in the semi-final.

On 31 May 2022, it was announced that Smolčić will move to Bundesliga side Eintracht Frankfurt for the 2022–23 season, on a five-year deal until 2027.

International career
On 14 August 2018, Smolčić played his first international game for the Croatian under-19 team, coming off the bench for Leon Kreković in a friendly match against Italy. After playing four more matches for the under-19 team and appearing in two matches for the under-20 squad, he debuted for the under-21 team on 8 October 2021 in a European Under-21 Championship qualifying match against Norway.

Career statistics

Honours
Rijeka
 Croatian Cup: 2018–19, 2019–20

References

External links
 

Living people
2000 births
Sportspeople from Gospić
Association football central defenders
Croatian footballers
Croatia youth international footballers
Croatia under-21 international footballers
HNK Rijeka players
Eintracht Frankfurt players
Croatian Football League players
Bundesliga players
Croatian expatriate footballers
Expatriate footballers in Germany
Croatian expatriate sportspeople in Germany